The 2011 Monte-Carlo Rolex Masters, a men's tennis tournament for male professional players, was played from 9 April through 17 April 2011, on outdoor clay courts and was part of the ATP World Tour Masters 1000 category of the 2011 ATP World Tour. It was the 105th edition of the annual Monte Carlo Masters tournament, which was sponsored by Rolex for the third time. It took place at the Monte Carlo Country Club in Roquebrune-Cap-Martin, France, near Monte Carlo, Monaco.

Tournament

Exhibition
On 11 April, an exhibition featuring two players from the Women's Tennis Association, current world number one Caroline Wozniacki and reigning French Open champion Francesca Schiavone, took place during the traditional women's day at the tournament. Schiavone won the one-set exhibition match 6–4.

Points and prize money

Points
Because the Monte Carlo Masters was the non-mandatory Masters 1000 event special rules around the point distribution happens. Monte Carlo Masters counted as one of a player's 500 level tournaments, while distributing Masters 1000 points.

Prize money

Entrants

Seeds

Rankings and seedings are as of 4 April 2011.

Other entrants
The following players received wildcards into the main draw:
  Tomáš Berdych
  Jean-René Lisnard
  Andy Murray
  Radek Štěpánek

The following players received entry via qualifying:

  Julien Benneteau
  Frederico Gil
  Máximo González
  Vincent Millot
  Pere Riba
  Olivier Rochus
  Filippo Volandri

Withdrawals

 Novak Djokovic (knee injury)

Finals

Singles

 Rafael Nadal defeated  David Ferrer, 6–4, 7–5.

Doubles

 Bob Bryan /  Mike Bryan defeated  Juan Ignacio Chela /  Bruno Soares, 6–3, 6–2.

References

External links
 Monte Carlo Masters official website* 
 Association of Tennis Professionals (ATP) tournament profile